= Hla Hla Aung =

Burmese geologist and seismologist

Hla Hla Aung is a Burmese geologist and seismologist. She is a patron of the Myanmar Earthquake Committee (MEC) and received the 2026 ASEAN Prize.

== Career ==
Hla Hla Aung earned a master's degree in geology from the University of Yangon and pursued a diploma in advanced cartography. She worked in the university's Department of Geology from 1969 to 1993, retiring as an associate lecturer. She later became a senior researcher and patron of the Myanmar Earthquake Committee.

Hla Hla Aung received the 2026 ASEAN Prize at the 49th ASEAN Summit in the Philippines on 15 November 2026.
